The  is a B-2-B wheel arrangement diesel-hydraulic locomotive type operated in Japan since 1962. 649 locomotives were built between 1962 and 1978 by Kawasaki Sharyo, Hitachi, and Mitsubishi. The class was designed for mainline passenger and freight use with more power than the D51 and a higher maximum speed than the C62 steam locomotive classes. This was achieved by installing two 1,100 hp engines in an 18 metre long centre-cab design, unusual for mainline operation. The V12 DML61 engines were developed from the 6-cylinder inline DMF31 engines used in the Class DD13 locomotives. , 29 locomotives remained in operation.

Variations
Locos numbered from DD51 501 to 799 and from 1001 to 1186 were equipped to operate in multiple, and locos numbered DD51 800 to 899 and 1801 to 1805 were built without steam generators for train heating.

Liveries
All locomotives numbered from DD51 2 onwards were finished in the standard diesel livery of orange/red with grey upper surfaces separated by a white stripe. Re-engined locos operated by JR Freight in Hokkaido sport a livery based on the Class DF200 colour scheme, with no white stripe. These locomotives were used in pairs double-heading freight trains.

JR Hokkaido locos were all finished in the "Hokutosei" livery of blue with a gold stripe and shooting star logo. These were used in pairs for hauling sleeper trains (Hokutosei, Cassiopeia, and Twilight Express) between Hakodate and Sapporo.

DD51 592 (now withdrawn), and now DD51 791, was repainted in the "Euroliner" livery of pale blue with dark blue stripes for use with JR Central's "Euroliner" Joyful Train set.

DD51 842 was designated as the Imperial Train locomotive. Whereas regular members of the class have white handrails and edges to the running boards, they are polished stainless steel on this particular locomotive, as are the exhaust shrouds. Based at Takasaki Depot, it is also used for special excursion trains.

Refurbishment

Many of the JR Freight locomotive underwent life extension refurbishment, which included removal of steam generator equipment where still fitted. These locos are distinguished by a new livery of blue with grey upper surfaces separated by a white stripe, and cream end panels.

DD51 class locomotives also formed the basis for the DD17, DD18, and DD19 self-propelled snow plough units.

Fleet allocation

Following the privatization of Japanese National Railways (JNR) on 1 April 1987, JR Hokkaido received 25 locomotives, JR East received 29, JR Central received 4, JR West received 63, JR Kyushu received one locomotive, and JR Freight received 137.

, 29 locomotives remained in operation, including 17 locomotives operated by JR Freight, four by JR East, and eight by JR West.

Overseas operations

Myanmar
A number of Class DD51 locomotives have been shipped to Myanmar for use on the Myanmar Railways.

, the status of DD51s shipped to Myanmar is as follows.

Locomotives DD51 1070 and DD51 1001 were heavily rebuilt with parts from other locomotives to form four Bo-Bo wheel arrangement locomotives used for depot shunting work.

Thailand
Two former Hokutousei DD51s were sent to Thailand for use during the conversion of some lines to double track. These were numbers DD51 1137 and DD51 1142.

Preserved examples
, seven class DD51 locomotives are preserved:
 DD51 1: Preserved at the Usui Pass Railway Heritage Park in Gunma Prefecture.
 DD51 548: Preserved at Crawford Park in Mikasa, Hokkaido.
 DD51 610: Preserved at the Mikasa Railway Village in Mikasa, Hokkaido.
 DD51 615: Preserved at the Otaru Museum in Otaru, Hokkaido.
 DD51 756: Preserved at the Kyoto Railway Museum in Kyoto since April 2016.
 DD51 1040: Preserved at the Railway History Park next to Namikawa Station in Kameoka, Kyoto.
 DD51 1187: Preserved at the Tsuyama Railroad Educational Museum in Tsuyama, Okayama.

The prototype, DD51 1, with its unique, more rounded appearance, was moved to the Usui Pass Railway Heritage Park in April 1998 and repainted in its original livery of brown with white lining. This locomotive was withdrawn March 1986, and was subsequently stored at Takasaki Depot from March 1987.

Classification

The DD51 classification for this locomotive type is explained below.
 D: Diesel locomotive
 D: Four driving axles
 51: Locomotive with maximum speed exceeding 85 km/h

References

Diesel locomotives of Japan
DD51
DD51
DD51
DD51
DD51
1067 mm gauge locomotives of Japan
Hitachi locomotives
Kawasaki diesel locomotives
Mitsubishi locomotives
Railway locomotives introduced in 1962
B-2-B locomotives